Engineers, as practitioners of engineering, are professionals who invent, design, analyze, build and test machines, complex systems, structures, gadgets and materials to fulfill functional objectives and requirements while considering the limitations imposed by practicality, regulation, safety and cost. The foundational qualifications of an engineer typically include a four-year bachelor's degree in an engineering discipline, or in some jurisdictions, a master's degree in an engineering discipline plus four to six years of peer-reviewed professional practice (culminating in a project report or thesis) and passage of engineering board examinations.

The work of engineers forms the link between scientific discoveries and their subsequent applications to human and business needs and quality of life.

Definition
In 1961, the Conference of Engineering Societies of Western Europe and the United States of America defined "professional engineer" as follows:

Roles and expertise

Design

Engineers develop new technological solutions. During the engineering design process, the responsibilities of the engineer may include defining problems, conducting and narrowing research, analyzing criteria, finding and analyzing solutions, and making decisions. Much of an engineer's time is spent on researching, locating, applying, and transferring information. Indeed, research suggests engineers spend 56% of their time engaged in various information behaviours, including 14% actively searching for information.

Engineers must weigh different design choices on their merits and choose the solution that best matches the requirements and needs. Their crucial and unique task is to identify, understand, and interpret the constraints on a design in order to produce a successful result.

Analysis

Engineers apply techniques of engineering analysis in testing, production, or maintenance. Analytical engineers may supervise production in factories and elsewhere, determine the causes of a process failure, and test output to maintain quality. They also estimate the time and cost required to complete projects. Supervisory engineers are responsible for major components or entire projects. Engineering analysis involves the application of scientific analytic principles and processes to reveal the properties and state of the system, device or mechanism under study. Engineering analysis proceeds by separating the engineering design into the mechanisms of operation or failure, analyzing or estimating each component of the operation or failure mechanism in isolation, and recombining the components. They may analyze risk.

Many engineers use computers to produce and analyze designs, to simulate and test how a machine, structure, or system operates, to generate specifications for parts, to monitor the quality of products, and to control the efficiency of processes.

Specialization and management

Most engineers specialize in one or more engineering disciplines. Numerous specialties are recognized by professional societies, and each of the major branches of engineering has numerous subdivisions. Civil engineering, for example, includes structural engineering, along with transportation engineering, geotechnical engineering, and materials engineering, including ceramic, metallurgical, and polymer engineering. Mechanical engineering cuts across most disciplines since its core essence is applied physics. Engineers also may specialize in one industry, such as motor vehicles, or in one type of technology, such as turbines or semiconductor materials.

Several recent studies have investigated how engineers spend their time; that is, the work tasks they perform and how their time is distributed among these. Research suggests that there are several key themes present in engineers' work: technical work (i.e., the application of science to product development), social work (i.e., interactive communication between people), computer-based work and information behaviors. Among other more detailed findings, a 2012 work sampling study found that engineers spend 62.92% of their time engaged in technical work, 40.37% in social work, and 49.66% in computer-based work. Furthermore, there was considerable overlap between these different types of work, with engineers spending 24.96% of their time engaged in technical and social work, 37.97% in technical and non-social, 15.42% in non-technical and social, and 21.66% in non-technical and non-social.

Engineering is also an information-intensive field, with research finding that engineers spend 55.8% of their time engaged in various different information behaviors, including 14.2% actively information from other people (7.8%) and information repositories such as documents and databases (6.4%).

The time engineers spend engaged in such activities is also reflected in the competencies required in engineering roles. In addition to engineers’ core technical competence, research has also demonstrated the critical nature of their personal attributes, project management skills, and cognitive abilities to success in the role.

Types of engineers

There are many branches of engineering, each of which specializes in specific technologies and products. Typically, engineers will have deep knowledge in one area and basic knowledge in related areas. For example, mechanical engineering curricula typically include introductory courses in electrical engineering, computer science, materials science, metallurgy, mathematics, and software engineering.

An engineer may either be hired for a firm that requires engineers on a continuous basis, or may belong to an engineering firm that provides engineering consulting services to other firms.

When developing a product, engineers typically work in interdisciplinary teams. For example, when building robots an engineering team will typically have at least three types of engineers. A mechanical engineer would design the body and actuators. An electrical engineer would design the power systems, sensors, electronics, embedded software in electronics, and control circuitry. Finally, a software engineer would develop the software that makes the robot behave properly. Engineers that aspire to management engage in further study in business administration, project management and organizational or business psychology. Often engineers move up the management hierarchy from managing projects, functional departments, divisions and eventually CEOs of a multi-national corporation.

Ethics

Engineers have obligations to the public, their clients, employers, and the profession. Many engineering societies have established codes of practice and codes of ethics to guide members and inform the public at large. Each engineering discipline and professional society maintains a code of ethics, which the members pledge to uphold. Depending on their specializations, engineers may also be governed by specific statute, whistleblowing, product liability laws, and often the principles of business ethics.

Some graduates of engineering programs in North America may be recognized by the iron ring or Engineer's Ring, a ring made of iron or stainless steel that is worn on the little finger of the dominant hand. This tradition began in 1925 in Canada with The Ritual of the Calling of an Engineer, where the ring serves as a symbol and reminder of the engineer's obligations to the engineering profession. In 1972, the practice was adopted by several colleges in the United States including members of the Order of the Engineer.

Education

Most engineering programs involve a concentration of study in an engineering specialty, along with courses in both mathematics and the physical and life sciences. Many programs also include courses in general engineering and applied accounting. A design course, often accompanied by a computer or laboratory class or both, is part of the curriculum of most programs. Often, general courses not directly related to engineering, such as those in the social sciences or humanities, also are required.

Accreditation is the process by which engineering programs are evaluated by an external body to determine if applicable standards are met. The Washington Accord serves as an international accreditation agreement for academic engineering degrees, recognizing the substantial equivalency in the standards set by many major national engineering bodies. In the United States, post-secondary degree programs in engineering are accredited by the Accreditation Board for Engineering and Technology.

Regulation

In many countries, engineering tasks such as the design of bridges, electric power plants, industrial equipment, machine design and chemical plants, must be approved by a licensed professional engineer. Most commonly titled professional engineer is a license to practice and is indicated with the use of post-nominal letters; PE or P.Eng. These are common in North America, as is European engineer (EUR ING) in Europe. The practice of engineering in the UK is not a regulated profession but the control of the titles of chartered engineer (CEng) and incorporated engineer (IEng) is regulated. These titles are protected by law and are subject to strict requirements defined by the Engineering Council UK. The title CEng is in use in much of the Commonwealth.

Many skilled and semi-skilled trades and engineering technicians in the UK call themselves engineers. A growing movement in the UK is to legally protect the title 'Engineer' so that only professional engineers can use it; a petition was started to further this cause.

In the United States, engineering is a regulated profession whose practice and practitioners are licensed and governed by law. Licensure is generally attainable through combination of education, pre-examination (Fundamentals of Engineering exam), examination (professional engineering exam), and engineering experience (typically in the area of 5+ years). Each state tests and licenses professional engineers. Currently, most states do not license by specific engineering discipline, but rather provide generalized licensure, and trust engineers to use professional judgment regarding their individual competencies; this is the favoured approach of the professional societies. Despite this, at least one of the examinations required by most states is actually focused on a particular discipline; candidates for licensure typically choose the category of examination which comes closest to their respective expertise. In the United States, an "industrial exemption" allows businesses to employ employees and call them an "engineer", as long as such individuals are under the direct supervision and control of the business entity and function internally related to manufacturing (manufactured parts) related to the business entity, or work internally within an exempt organization. Such person does not have the final authority to approve, or the ultimate responsibility for, engineering designs, plans, or specifications that are to be incorporated into fixed works, systems, or facilities on the property of others or made available to the public. These individuals are prohibited from offering engineering services directly to the public or other businesses, or engage in practice of engineering unless the business entity is registered with the state's board of engineering, and the practice is carried on or supervised directly only by engineers licensed to engage in the practice of engineering. In some instances, some positions, such as a "sanitation engineer", does not have any basis in engineering sciences. Although some states require a BS degree in engineering accredited by the Engineering Accreditation Commission (EAC) of Accreditation Board for Engineering and Technology (ABET) with no exceptions, about two thirds of the states accept BS degrees in engineering technology accredited by the Engineering Technology Accreditation Commission (ETAC) of ABET to become licensed as professional engineers. Each state has different requirements on years of experience to take the Fundamentals of Engineering (FE) and Professional Engineering (PE) exams. A few states require a graduate MS in engineering to sit for the exams as further learning. After seven years of working after graduation, two years of responsibility for significant engineering work, continuous professional development, some highly qualified PEs are able to become International Professional Engineers Int(PE). These engineers must meet the highest level of professional competencies and this is a peer reviewed process. Once the IntPE title is awarded, the engineer can gain easier admission to national registers of a number of members jurisdictions for international practice.

In Canada, engineering is a self-regulated profession. The profession in each province is governed by its own engineering association. For instance, in the Province of British Columbia an engineering graduate with four or more years of post graduate experience in an engineering-related field and passing exams in ethics and law will need to be registered by the Association for Professional Engineers and Geoscientists (APEGBC) in order to become a Professional Engineer and be granted the professional designation of P.Eng allowing one to practice engineering.

In Continental Europe, Latin America, Turkey, and elsewhere the title is limited by law to people with an engineering degree and the use of the title by others is illegal. In Italy, the title is limited to people who hold an engineering degree, have passed a professional qualification examination (Esame di Stato) and are enrolled in the register of the local branch of National Associations of Engineers (a public body). In Portugal, professional engineer titles and accredited engineering degrees are regulated and certified by the Ordem dos Engenheiros. In the Czech Republic, the title "engineer" (Ing.) is given to people with a (masters) degree in chemistry, technology or economics for historical and traditional reasons. In Greece, the academic title of "Diploma Engineer" is awarded after completion of the five-year engineering study course and the title of "Certified Engineer" is awarded after completion of the four-year course of engineering studies at a Technological Educational Institute (TEI).

Perception

The perception and definition of the term 'engineer' varies across countries and continents.

Corporate culture
In companies and other organizations, there is sometimes a tendency to undervalue people with advanced technological and scientific skills compared to celebrities, fashion practitioners, entertainers, and managers. In his book, The Mythical Man-Month, Fred Brooks Jr says that managers think of senior people as "too valuable" for technical tasks and that management jobs carry higher prestige. He tells how some laboratories, such as Bell Labs, abolish all job titles to overcome this problem: a professional employee is a "member of the technical staff." IBM maintains a dual ladder of advancement; the corresponding managerial and engineering or scientific rungs are equivalent. Brooks recommends that structures need to be changed; the boss must give a great deal of attention to keeping managers and technical people as interchangeable as their talents allow.

Europe 

, thirty two countries in Europe (including nearly all 27 countries of the EU) now recognise the title of 'European Engineer' which permits the use of the pre-nominal title of "EUR ING" (always fully capitalised). Each country sets its own precise qualification requirement for the use of the title (though they are all broadly equivalent). Holding the requisite qualification does not afford automatic entitlement. The title has to be applied for (and the appropriate fee paid). The holder is entitled to use the title in their passport. EUR INGs are allowed to describe themselves as professionally qualified engineers and practise as such in any of the 32 participating countries including those where the title of engineer is regulated by law.

UK 

British school children in the 1950s were brought up with stirring tales of "the Victorian Engineers", chief among whom were Brunel, Stephenson, Telford, and their contemporaries. In the UK, "engineering" has more recently been erroneously styled as an industrial sector consisting of employers and employees loosely termed "engineers" who include tradespeople. However, knowledgeable practitioners reserve the term "engineer" to describe a university-educated professional of ingenuity represented by the Chartered (or Incorporated) Engineer qualifications. A large proportion of the UK public incorrectly thinks of "engineers" as skilled tradespeople or even semi-skilled tradespeople with a high school education. Also, many UK skilled and semi-skilled tradespeople falsely style themselves as "engineers". This has created confusion in the eyes of some members of the public in understanding what professional engineers actually do, from fixing car engines, television sets and refrigerators (technicians, handymen) to designing and managing the development of aircraft, spacecraft, power stations, infrastructure and other complex technological systems (engineers).

France 

In France, the term  (engineer) is not a protected title and can be used by anyone who practices this profession.

However, the title  (graduate engineer) is an official academic title that is protected by the government and is associated with the Diplôme d'Ingénieur, which is a renowned academic degree in France. Anyone misusing this title in France can be fined a large sum and jailed, as it is usually reserved for graduates of French engineering grandes écoles. Engineering schools which were created during the French revolution have a special reputation among the French people, as they helped to make the transition from a mostly agricultural country of late 18th century to the industrially developed France of the 19th century. A great part of 19th-century France's economic wealth and industrial prowess was created by engineers that have graduated from École Centrale Paris, École des Mines de Paris, École polytechnique or Télécom Paris. This was also the case after WWII when France had to be rebuilt. Before the "réforme René Haby" in the 1970s, it was very difficult to be admitted to such schools, and the French  were commonly perceived as the nation's elite. However, after the Haby reform and a string of further reforms (Modernization plans of French universities), several engineering schools were created which can be accessed with relatively lower competition.

In France, engineering positions are now shared between the  graduating from engineering ; and the holders of a Master's degree in Science from public universities.

Italy 

In Italy, only people who hold a formal engineering qualification of at least a bachelor's degree are permitted to describe themselves as an engineer.  So much so that people holding such qualifications are entitled to use the pre-nominal title of "" (or "" if female - in both cases often abbreviated to "Ing.") in lieu of "Signore", "Signorina" or "Signora" (Mr, Miss and Mrs respectively) in the same manner as someone holding a doctorate would use the pre-nominal title "Doctor".

North America

Canada 
In Canada, engineering is a regulated profession whose practice and practitioners are licensed and governed by law. Licensed professional engineers are referred to as P.Eng. Many Canadian engineers wear an Iron Ring.

In all Canadian provinces, the title "Professional Engineer" is protected by law and any non-licensed individual or company using the title is committing a legal offence and is subject to fines and restraining orders. Contrary to insistence from the Professional Engineers Ontario ("PEO") and Engineers Canada, use of the title "Engineer" itself has been found by Canadian law to be acceptable by those not holding P.Eng. titles. 

The title of engineer is not exclusive to P.Eng titles. The title of Engineer is commonly held by "Software Engineer", the Canadian Military as various ranks and positions, railway locomotive engineers, and Aircraft Maintenance Engineers (AME), all of which do not commonly hold a P.Eng. designation.

United States 
In the United States, the practice of professional engineering is highly regulated and the title "professional engineer" is legally protected, meaning that it is unlawful to use it to offer engineering services to the public unless permission, certification or other official endorsement is specifically granted by that state through a professional engineering license.

Spanish-speaking countries 

Certain Spanish-speaking countries follow the Italian convention of engineers using the pre-nominal title, in this case "" (or "" if female). Like in Italy, it is usually abbreviated to "Ing." In Spain this practice is not followed.

The engineering profession enjoys high prestige in Spain, ranking close to medical doctors, scientists and professors, and above judges, journalists or entrepreneurs, according to a 2014 study.

Asia and Africa 
In the Indian subcontinent, Russia, Middle East, Africa, and China, engineering is one of the most sought after undergraduate courses, inviting thousands of applicants to show their ability in highly competitive entrance examinations.

In Egypt, the educational system makes engineering the second-most-respected profession in the country (after medicine); engineering colleges at Egyptian universities requires extremely high marks on the General Certificate of Secondary Education ( al-Thānawiyyah al-`Āmmah)—on the order of 97 or 98%—and are thus considered (along with the colleges of medicine, natural science, and pharmacy) to be among the "pinnacle colleges" ( kullīyāt al-qimmah).

In the Philippines and Filipino communities overseas, engineers who are either Filipino or not, especially those who also profess other jobs at the same time, are addressed and introduced as Engineer, rather than Sir/Madam in speech or Mr./Mrs./Ms. (G./Gng./Bb. in Filipino) before surnames. That word is used either in itself or before the given name or surname.

See also
 Building engineer
 Engineer's degree
 Engineers Without Borders
 European Engineer
 Greatest Engineering Achievements
 History of engineering
 List of Bangladeshi engineers
 List of engineering branches
 List of engineers
 List of fictional scientists and engineers

References

External links

Engineering occupations
 
Science occupations